The Drysdale grunter (Syncomistes rastellus) is a species of fish in the family Terapontidae. It is endemic to Australia, where it occurs in the Gibb and Drysdale Rivers, coastal rivers in northern Western Australia. It is a herbivorous species which grazes on filamentous algae and prefers the main river channels rather than the tributaries, it also prefers flowing water of varying turbidity and substrate.

References

Drysdale grunter
Endemic fauna of Australia
Freshwater fish of Western Australia
Drysdale grunter
Taxonomy articles created by Polbot